Offutt Covered Bridge is a historic covered bridge located near Rushville, Indiana in Jackson Township, Rush County, Indiana. It was built in 1877 by A.M. Kennedy and his son Emmett. The bridge has rounded arch portals and decorative scrollwork that are signatures of the Kennedy firm.

It was listed on the U.S. National Register of Historic Places in 1983, as part of a multiple property submission covering six bridges built by the Kennedy family firm.

References

Truss bridges in the United States
Covered bridges on the National Register of Historic Places in Indiana
Bridges completed in 1884
Bridges in Rush County, Indiana
National Register of Historic Places in Rush County, Indiana
Road bridges on the National Register of Historic Places in Indiana
Wooden bridges in Indiana
Burr Truss bridges in the United States